Podocarpus macrocarpus is a species of conifer in the family Podocarpaceae. It is found only in the Philippines.

References

macrocarpus
Least concern plants
Taxonomy articles created by Polbot
Taxa named by David John de Laubenfels